Koti Lateh (also Romanized as Kotī Lateh; also known as Kotī Latak) is a village in Sharq va Gharb-e Shirgah Rural District, North Savadkuh County, Mazandaran Province, Iran. At the 2006 census, its population was 440, in 128 families.

References 

Populated places in Savadkuh County